Gavrilovsky (masculine), Gavrilovskaya (feminine), or Gavrilovskoye (neuter) is the name of several  rural localities in Russia.

Altai Krai
As of 2010, one rural locality in Altai Krai bears this name:
Gavrilovsky, Altai Krai, a settlement in Nikolayevsky Selsoviet of Pospelikhinsky District

Arkhangelsk Oblast
As of 2010, five rural localities in Arkhangelsk Oblast bear this name:
Gavrilovskaya, Kargopolsky District, Arkhangelsk Oblast, a village in Pechnikovsky Selsoviet of Kargopolsky District
Gavrilovskaya, Konoshsky District, Arkhangelsk Oblast, a village in Klimovsky Selsoviet of Konoshsky District
Gavrilovskaya, Krasnoborsky District, Arkhangelsk Oblast, a village in Lyakhovsky Selsoviet of Krasnoborsky District
Gavrilovskaya, Limsky Selsoviet, Nyandomsky District, Arkhangelsk Oblast, a village in Limsky Selsoviet of Nyandomsky District
Gavrilovskaya, Moshinsky Selsoviet, Nyandomsky District, Arkhangelsk Oblast, a village in Moshinsky Selsoviet of Nyandomsky District

Astrakhan Oblast
As of 2010, one rural locality in Astrakhan Oblast bears this name:
Gavrilovsky, Astrakhan Oblast, a settlement in Chulpansky Selsoviet of Ikryaninsky District

Republic of Bashkortostan
As of 2010, one rural locality in the Republic of Bashkortostan bears this name:
Gavrilovsky, Republic of Bashkortostan, a khutor in Isimovsky Selsoviet of Kugarchinsky District

Irkutsk Oblast
As of 2010, one rural locality in Irkutsk Oblast bears this name:
Gavrilovskaya, Irkutsk Oblast, a village in Cheremkhovsky District

Kirov Oblast
As of 2010, one rural locality in Kirov Oblast bears this name:
Gavrilovskaya, Kirov Oblast, a village in Papulovsky Rural Okrug of Luzsky District

Kostroma Oblast
As of 2010, five rural localities in Kostroma Oblast bear this name:
Gavrilovskoye, Buysky District, Kostroma Oblast, a village in Tsentralnoye Settlement of Buysky District
Gavrilovskoye, Chukhlomsky District, Kostroma Oblast, a village in Nozhkinskoye Settlement of Chukhlomsky District
Gavrilovskoye, Dmitriyevskoye Settlement, Galichsky District, Kostroma Oblast, a selo in Dmitriyevskoye Settlement of Galichsky District
Gavrilovskoye, Orekhovskoye Settlement, Galichsky District, Kostroma Oblast, a village in Orekhovskoye Settlement of Galichsky District
Gavrilovskoye, Susaninsky District, Kostroma Oblast, a village under the administrative jurisdiction of Susanino Urban Settlement (urban-type settlement) of Susaninsky District

Kursk Oblast
As of 2010, one rural locality in Kursk Oblast bears this name:
Gavrilovsky, Kursk Oblast, a settlement in Troyanovsky Selsoviet of Zheleznogorsky District

Moscow Oblast
As of 2010, three rural localities in Moscow Oblast bear this name:
Gavrilovskoye, Moscow Oblast, a selo in Gazoprovodskoye Rural Settlement of Lukhovitsky District
Gavrilovskaya, Shatursky District, Moscow Oblast, a village under the administrative jurisdiction of the Town of Shatura in Shatursky District
Gavrilovskaya, Yegoryevsky District, Moscow Oblast, a village under the administrative jurisdiction of the Town of Yegoryevsk in Yegoryevsky District

Oryol Oblast
As of 2010, two rural localities in Oryol Oblast bear this name:
Gavrilovskoye, Oryol Oblast, a selo in Gerasimovsky Selsoviet of Shablykinsky District
Gavrilovskaya, Oryol Oblast, a village in Zhilyayevsky Selsoviet of Orlovsky District

Ryazan Oblast
As of 2010, three rural localities in Ryazan Oblast bear this name:
Gavrilovskoye, Chuchkovsky District, Ryazan Oblast, a village in Aleyevsky Rural Okrug of Chuchkovsky District
Gavrilovskoye, Sasovsky District, Ryazan Oblast, a selo in Gavrilovsky Rural Okrug of Sasovsky District
Gavrilovskoye, Spassky District, Ryazan Oblast, a selo in Gavrilovsky Rural Okrug of Spassky District

Samara Oblast
As of 2010, one rural locality in Samara Oblast bears this name:
Gavrilovsky, Samara Oblast, a settlement in Alexeyevsky District

Tver Oblast
As of 2010, one rural locality in Tver Oblast bears this name:
Gavrilovskoye, Tver Oblast, a village in Sandovsky District

Vladimir Oblast
As of 2010, one rural locality in Vladimir Oblast bears this name:
Gavrilovskoye, Vladimir Oblast, a selo in Suzdalsky District

Vologda Oblast
As of 2010, two rural localities in Vologda Oblast bear this name:
Gavrilovskaya, Tarnogsky District, Vologda Oblast, a village in Verkhnespassky Selsoviet of Tarnogsky District
Gavrilovskaya, Vashkinsky District, Vologda Oblast, a village in Andreyevsky Selsoviet of Vashkinsky District

Yaroslavl Oblast
As of 2010, two rural localities in Yaroslavl Oblast bear this name:
Gavrilovskoye, Rybinsky District, Yaroslavl Oblast, a village in Volzhsky Rural Okrug of Rybinsky District
Gavrilovskoye, Tutayevsky District, Yaroslavl Oblast, a village in Borisoglebsky Rural Okrug of Tutayevsky District